This is a list of broadcast television stations that are licensed in the U.S. state of Louisiana.

Full-power stations
VC refers to the station's PSIP virtual channel. RF refers to the station's physical RF channel.

Defunct full-power stations
Channel 11: KHMA - Ind. - Houma (3/1/1972-1974)
Channel 13: KLSE - ETV - Monroe (3/9/1957-7/1/1964)
Channel 15: KLNI-TV - NBC - Lafayette (9/16/1968-2/21/75)
Channel 20: WJMR-TV - CBS/ABC - New Orleans (11/1/1953-1/1/1959)
Channel 25: KTAG-TV - CBS/ABC/DuMont - Lake Charles (11/2/1953-8/3/1961)
Channel 39: KUZN-TV - Ind. - West Monroe (8/19/1967-1/12/1968)
Channel 39: KYAY-TV - Ind. - West Monroe (8/31/1970-8/16/1971)
Channel 43: KFAZ-TV - Monroe (8/11/1953-5/1/1954)
Channel 49: WCCL (original incarnation) - Ind. - New Orleans (3/19/1989-spring 1990)

LPTV stations

Translators

See also
 Louisiana media
 List of newspapers in Louisiana
 List of radio stations in Louisiana
 Media of locales in Louisiana: Baton Rouge, Lafayette, Monroe, New Orleans, Shreveport, Terrebonne Parish

Bibliography

External links
 
  (Directory ceased in 2017)
 Louisiana Association of Broadcasters
 
 
 
 
 

Louisiana

Televisionstations